Lists of political memoirs include:

 List of American political memoirs
 List of Australian political memoirs
 List of British political memoirs
 List of memoirs of political prisoners